Leslie P. Langworthy (1848–1919) was an American architect from Providence, Rhode Island.

Life and career
Leslie Pendleton Langworthy was born in 1848 in Little Genesee, New York. He began practicing as an architect in Rhode Island during the 1880s.  He was alone until about 1910, when he incorporated his sons into his new firm of L. P. Langworthy & Company. He died in Providence in 1919.

He is best remembered for the Richardsonian Romanesque design of the Washington County Courthouse in West Kingston.

Architectural Works
 1891 - Beacon Avenue Primary School, 104 Beacon Ave, Providence, Rhode Island
 1892 - Washington County Courthouse, 3481 Kingstown Rd, West Kingston, Rhode Island
 1897 - Hope Valley School (Remodeling), Main St, Hope Valley, Rhode Island
 Demolished
 1902 - Providence Smallpox Hospital, Fields Point, Providence, Rhode Island
 Demolished
 1908 - East Hall, University of Rhode Island, Kingston, Rhode Island
 1912 - Riverside Grammar School, 100 Bullocks Point Ave, Riverside, Rhode Island
 1912 - Rumford Grammar School, 64 Bourne Ave, Rumford, Rhode Island
 Demolished

References

19th-century American architects
20th-century American architects
Architects from Providence, Rhode Island
1848 births
1919 deaths